David T. "Dave" Woodward (born 1976) is an American politician currently serving as Chairman of the Oakland County Board of Commissioners since 2019. A member of the Democratic Party, he has served on the Oakland County Board of Commissioners since 2005. He previously served as a member of the Michigan House of Representatives from 1999 to 2004, representing District 26.

References 

Living people
1976 births
County commissioners in Michigan
Democratic Party members of the Michigan House of Representatives
People from Royal Oak, Michigan
Wayne State University alumni
20th-century American politicians
21st-century American politicians